Reshma Shinde is an Indian Marathi actress. She is known for her lead role in Rang Maza Vegla as Deepa.

Career 
In 2009, he participated in Maharashtracha Superstar 1 as a contestant. After that she received an offer from the television show Bandh Resmache on Star Pravah. In 2014, she got a role in Lagori - Maitri Returns as Purva. In 2015, she played a negative role in Nanda Saukhya Bhare. In 2016, she had a role in Chahul, a horror television show as Shambhavi. She also played supporting roles in Marathi films. Most recently, she appeared in Rang Maza Vegla as Deepa.

Filmography

References

External links 
 Reshma Shinde on IMDb

Actresses in Marathi television
Actresses in Marathi cinema
Living people
1987 births